The Spa Valley Railway (SVR) is a standard gauge heritage railway that runs from Tunbridge Wells West railway station in Tunbridge Wells to High Rocks, Groombridge, and Eridge, where it links with the Oxted Line. 

The railway headquarters is also at Tunbridge Wells West railway station.

History

The railway was engineered by the London, Brighton and South Coast Railway's (LB&SCR) Chief Engineer Frederick Banister, as part of the East Grinstead, Groombridge and Tunbridge Wells Railway (EGGTWR). This being an extension to the Three Bridges to East Grinstead Railway which had been completed in 1855.

The EGGTWR was part of a regional race between the LB&SCR and the SER, and a specific race to access the town of Royal Tunbridge Wells:

From Tunbridge Wells West railway station. There were direct services to the South Coast at Brighton and Eastbourne and to London Victoria. The Victoria services ran via Groombridge and Ashurst. A sign outside the station proudly proclaimed, "New Route to London: Shortest, Quickest and Most Direct. Frequent Express Trains".

Closure

As the popularity of the motor car increased, train services were severely cut back due to the lack of patronage, and the number of services passing through Tunbridge Wells West railway station declined as one line after another was closed from the 1950s onwards. First, the East Grinstead to Lewes line closed in 1958, then the Cuckoo Line in 1965, the Three Bridges to Groombridge in 1967, and finally the Wealden Line south of Uckfield in 1969. The line between Tunbridge Wells and Eridge was itself listed for closure in 1966, only to be subsequently reprieved. The line remained open, although in its latter years passenger services were mainly confined to a shuttle service between Tonbridge (via the single line connection to Tunbridge Wells Central – now plain Tunbridge Wells) and Eridge with a few through trains to Uckfield. However, there was a depot at Tunbridge Wells West which housed rolling stock for services on the Uckfield– and East Grinstead–London (via East Croydon) lines, and there were several empty stock moves early and late in the day.

By the early 1980s, the track and signalling needed to be replaced. British Rail — at the time carrying out an upgrade of the Tonbridge to Hastings Line which included the renewal of Grove Junction — decided that the cost of keeping the line from Eridge to Grove Jn open and undertaking the works, some £175,000, did not justify the outlay. BR therefore, announced the proposed closure of the line (including Groombridge and Tunbridge Wells West station) from 16 May 1983 which was later deferred after public objections. The Secretary of State for Transport agreed to the withdrawal of passenger services, which took effect from 6 July 1985. Although the section between Tunbridge Wells West and Birchden Jn remained open for rolling stock movements until 10 August, when the depot at Tunbridge Wells West station was shut. At the time of closure, Tunbridge Wells West station had gas lighting, which was in operation in the ticket office and under the canopy.

Preservation

Restoration
The Spa Valley Railway (SVR) has its origins in a charitable society formed on 13 September 1985, to purchase and reopen the Tunbridge Wells West to Eridge line. Named the Tunbridge Wells and Eridge Railway Preservation Society (TWERPS), it began a long struggle to reopen the line. While the 1891 locomotive shed and station building were protected as listed buildings, the remaining area of the site was obliterated, including the goods shed and signal boxes. However, planning permission was subject to the condition that the developer pay for construction of a new station platform and restoration of the engine shed.

The North Downs Steam Railway relocated from Dartford in 1996, where it was experiencing vandalism problems, and merged with TWERPS. It transferred its assets and helped establish a base in the former LB&SCR locomotive shed. The group had also acquired the line as far as Birchden Junction during that year. Services were extended to Groombridge in August 1997 and to Birchden Junction in 2005.

In 2007, SVR marked the 10th anniversary of the opening of the line by transforming Groombridge into a busy interchange station, with trains arriving or departing every 15 minutes. The funds raised from this event went towards the "Return to Eridge" appeal to raise £500,000 for the extension to the Uckfield main line at Eridge.

In August 2017, a special event (20th Birthday Bash) was held to celebrate 20 years since the reopening of the line to Groombridge, starring a variety of home and visiting locomotives, including BR Standard 4 Tank 80078.

Operations
The SVR provides a way of getting to other local tourist attractions, such as Groombridge Place, High Rocks and the Pantiles in Tunbridge Wells.

The railway holds a number of special event days throughout the year, including Transport Film Festivals, Santa Specials, a Summer Diesel Gala and also Real Ale & Cider festival (jointly organized by CAMRA), which is combined with the railway's autumn diesel gala and held each October.

The railway operates between February and October, as well as on Tuesdays, Wednesdays and Thursdays in the summer months. In December, the railway operates Santa Special services until Christmas, and then runs on selected days between Christmas and/including New Year's Day.

During November and January, the line is usually closed to the public. This allows the railway's infrastructure department time to carry out major track renewals such as installation of new point work, something that Groombridge and Tunbridge Wells West have both benefited from in recent times.

Future
Whilst the Spa Valley Railway certainly has no current plans to extend its operational railway line, it has a stated aim "...to continually develop its railway services and facilities". Its business plan states that the SVR "will seek to protect the alignment of the closed railway lines around Eridge, that may at some future time provide the basis for an extension of our railway".

Rolling stock

Steam

Operational

Non-operational

Diesel and electric locomotives

Operational

Non-operational

Multiple Units 
DMU s are diesel multiple units. EMUs are electric multiple units but these are only being used as static or hauled stock on this line.

Carriages

References

External links 

 Spa Valley Railway website.
 Heritage Railway Association website.

Heritage railways in Kent
Heritage railways in East Sussex
Railway companies established in 1996
Borough of Tunbridge Wells
Standard gauge railways in England
Rolling stock on the Spa Valley Railway
British companies established in 1996